The Pastore della Lessinia e del Lagorai is an old Italian dog breed from the northeastern region called Triveneto. It is not recognized by any major kennel organisation.

Origin 
In 2018, a genetic study found that just prior to 1859 a broadly distributed European herding dog had given rise to the German Shepherd Dog, the French Berger Picard, and the five Italian herding breeds: the Bergamasco Shepherd, Cane Paratore, Lupino del Gigante, Pastore d'Oropa, and the Pastore della Lessinia e del Lagorai.

The Pastore della Lessinia e del Lagorai has been traditionally used in pastoral activities, such as managing herd and driving cattle across plains of Triveneto. Still used for the same purpose, natural selection has made it a rustic and healthy working dog. There is a project going on to protect the breed from extinction and to gain an official breed status, led by Società Italiana Pastore della Lessinia e del Lagorai.

Appearance 
The Pastore della Lessinia e del Lagorai is a medium-sized, agile sheepdog of the "lupine" type. The ears are large and triangular, being either erect, semi-erect (folded) or drooping. The coat is semi-long and the undercoat is thick. Typical colours include fawn, merle (blue or red), brown, and black.

Temperament 
The breed is lively, active, docile, and curious, requiring plenty of exercise. It is also a tireless worker, driving both sheep, cattle, and horse.

See also
 Dogs portal
 List of dog breeds

Sources 

Dog breeds originating in Italy
Rare dog breeds
Herding dogs